Stergusa stelligera is a species of spider of the genus Stergusa. It is endemic to Sri Lanka.

References

Salticidae
Endemic fauna of Sri Lanka
Spiders of Asia
Spiders described in 1902